Ramigekko swartbergensis, sometimes called the Swartberg (African) leaf-toed gecko, is a species of African gecko which is a localized endemic of the Cape Fold Belt in South Africa. It is monotypic in the genus Ramigekko.

Anatomy
Like other "leaf-toed" geckoes, they have a single pair of enlarged adhesive pads on the terminally end of each digit. Only this species however has smoothed and flattened tubercles on its dorsal parts. The head has a deeper contour and some cranial differences (fusion of nasal and parietal bones) set them apart from most other gecko species.

Range and habitat
It is found along the crests of the Swartberg and Klein Swartberg ranges, from Towerkop in the west to the vicinity of Meiringspoort. They favour north-facing sandstone outcrops in montane fynbos, from 1,300 to 2,100 m a.s.l. They occur in protected areas and are not endangered.

Habits
They hide in rock cracks or under rock flakes, emerging to feed on insects. Like all "leaf-toed" geckoes they are nocturnal and lay hard-shelled eggs, which are deposited in clutches of two.

References

Gekkonidae
Monotypic lizard genera
Reptiles described in 1996